Hamilton Schoolhouse is a historic one-room school building located near Lexington, Rockbridge County, Virginia. It was built in 1823, and is a one-story, one room log building measuring 22 feet by 24 feet.  It was in use as a school until 1928, after which it was used as a community center.

It was listed on the National Register of Historic Places in 2002.

References

One-room schoolhouses in Virginia
School buildings on the National Register of Historic Places in Virginia
School buildings completed in 1823
Schools in Rockbridge County, Virginia
National Register of Historic Places in Rockbridge County, Virginia